Pals of the Prairie is a 1929 American silent Western film intertwined with the romance of the mayor's daughter Dolores (Joyce) and Franciseo (Renaldo). After Francisco is kidnapped by friends of his romantic rival Pete Sangor (Patton), Red Harper (Barton) and Hank Robbins (Rice) must rescue him.

Cast
 Natalie Joyce as Dolores
 Duncan Renaldo as Francisco
 Bill Patton as Pete Sangor
 Buzz Barton as Red Hepner
 Frank Rice as Hank Robbins
 Thomas G. Lingham as  Don José Valencia

References

External links
 
 
 
 

1929 films
American black-and-white films
1929 Western (genre) films
Film Booking Offices of America films
1929 drama films
Silent American Western (genre) films
Films directed by Louis King
1920s English-language films
1920s American films